The following elections occurred in the year 1899.

Africa

Liberia
 1899 Liberian general election

Southern Rhodesia
 1899 Southern Rhodesian Legislative Council election

Asia

Philippines
 1899 Philippine local election

Europe

Portugal
 1899 Portuguese legislative election

United Kingdom
 1899 Clackmannanshire and Kinross-shire by-election
 1899 Elland by-election
 1899 Merionethshire by-election
 1899 Oldham by-election
 1899 Osgoldcross by-election

North America

Canada
 1899 Edmonton municipal election
 1899 Manitoba general election
 1899 New Brunswick general election

United States
 1899 Kentucky gubernatorial election
 United States Senate election in New York, 1899

Oceania

Australia
 1899 South Australian colonial election

New Zealand
 1899 New Zealand general election
 1899 City of Wellington by-election

South America

Peru
 1899 Peruvian presidential election

See also
 :Category:1899 elections

1899
Elections